Gisozi may refer to:

Gisozi, Burundi, a town in Burundi
Gisozi, Rwanda, a sector in Rwanda 
Commune of Gisozi, whose seat is Gisozi, Burundi